Yelena Pershina (born 24 December 1963, in Kharkiv, Ukrainian SSR) is a retired female long jumper from  Kazakhstan. Her personal best jump was 6.91 metres, achieved in August 1992 in Alma Ata (now Almaty).

She competed at the World Championships in 1997 and 1999 as well as the Olympic Games in 1996 and 2000 without reaching the final round.

On the regional level she won a gold medal at the 1995 Asian Championships and bronze medals at the 1998 Asian Championships and the 1998 Asian Games. At the 1995 Asian Championships she also won a bronze medal in the triple jump.

Achievements

References

External links
 

1963 births
Living people
Sportspeople from Kharkiv
Ukrainian female long jumpers
Kazakhstani female long jumpers
Athletes (track and field) at the 1996 Summer Olympics
Athletes (track and field) at the 2000 Summer Olympics
Olympic athletes of Kazakhstan
Athletes (track and field) at the 1998 Asian Games
Asian Games medalists in athletics (track and field)
Asian Games bronze medalists for Kazakhstan
Medalists at the 1998 Asian Games
Kazakhstani people of Ukrainian descent